The 2016–17 Purdue Boilermakers men's basketball team represented Purdue University in the 2016–17 NCAA Division I men's basketball season. Their head coach was Matt Painter, in his 12th season with the Boilers. The team played their home games in Mackey Arena in West Lafayette, Indiana and were members of the Big Ten Conference. With their win over Indiana on February 28, 2017, Purdue clinched their first  Big Ten Championship since 2009, 22nd overall. With Wisconsin's loss on March 2, Purdue clinched an outright championship, their 23rd championship, the most in Big Ten history. They finished the season 27–8, 14–4 in to win the Big Ten regular season championship. In the Big Ten tournament, they lost in the quarterfinals to Michigan. They received an at-large bid to the NCAA tournament as the No. 4 seed in the Midwest Region where they beat Vermont and Iowa State to advance to the Sweet Sixteen. In their first trip to the Sweet Sixteen since 2010, they lost to No. 1-seeded and No. 3-ranked Kansas.

Previous season
The Boilermakers finished the 2015–16 season with a record of 26–9, 12–6 in Big Ten play to finish in a four-way tie for third place. As the No. 4 seed in the Big Ten tournament, they defeated Illinois and Michigan to advance to the championship game. In the championship game, they lost to Michigan State. The Boilermakers received an at-large bid to the NCAA tournament where, as a No. 5 seed, they were upset by No. 12-seeded Little Rock in the First Round.

Preseason
Purdue was picked to finish second in the Big Ten in preseason polls by Sports Illustrated and USA Today. Caleb Swanigan was named to the preseason All-Big Ten team as voted by a panel of conference media.

Offseason

Departures

Incoming transfers

Roster

Class of 2016 recruits
Carsen Edwards accepted Purdue's offer August 11, 2015. He knew other guards had official visits to the university scheduled, and wanted to accept his offer while he had the chance. He said, "If I were to wait and let them get there, I may miss a good opportunity, so I went ahead and took it."

Matt Haarms had his first official visit to Purdue in September 2016. Haarms liked Purdue's history of developing centers and forwards, saying "some of the greatest big men are coming out of Purdue." He committed to Purdue in October 2016.

Class of 2017 recruits

Schedule and results

|-
!colspan=9 style=| Spanish exhibition tour

|-
!colspan=9 style=|  Exhibition

|-
!colspan=9 style=|Non-conference regular season

|-
!colspan=9 style=|Big Ten regular season

|-
!colspan=9 style=| Big Ten tournament

|-
!colspan=9 style=| NCAA tournament

Rankings

*AP does not release post-NCAA tournament rankings

Awards and honors

Caleb Swanigan
 Big Ten Player of the Year (media and coaches) (unanimous selection)
 All-Big Ten First Team (media and coaches) (unanimous selection)
 AP Big Ten Player of the year (unanimous selection)
 AP All-Big Ten First Team (unanimous selection)

Dakota Mathias
 All-Big Ten Honorable Mention (coaches and media)
 All-Big Ten Defensive Team

Vincent Edwards
 All-Big Ten Third Team (media)
 All-Big Ten Honorable Mention (coaches)

See also
2016–17 Purdue Boilermakers women's basketball team

References

Purdue Boilermakers men's basketball seasons
Purdue
2016 in sports in Indiana
2017 in sports in Indiana
Purdue